CNDP may refer to:

 National Congress for the Defence of the People, a political armed militia in the Democratic Republic of the Congo
 National Convention of Progressive Democrats, a political party in Burkina Faso
 Centre National de Documentation Pédagogique, publisher of the Ministry of National Education (France)
 Châteauneuf-du-Pape AOC, a French wine appellation in the Rhône wine region in southeastern France, and the wine produced therein.